Association of Mennonite Evangelical Churches in France is the conference of Mennonites in France. It is a member of the Mennonite World Conference.

History 

The AEEMF has its origins in two organizations, the Association of Mennonite Churches of France, founded in 1925 and the French-speaking Mennonite Churches, founded in 1928.  The two organizations merged in 1980 to form the Association of Evangelical Mennonite Churches of France.

Statistics 
According to a census of the denomination, in 2022, it would have 31 churches and 2,100 members.

References

Further reading
J. S. Oyer, The Strasbourg Conferences of the Anabaptists, 1554-1607, Mennonite Quarterly Review, 1984, vol. 58, no.3, pp. 218–229
Jean Séguy, Les assemblées anabaptistes-mennonites de France, 1977,

External links
Neff, Christian and Ernst H. Correll. "Alsace (France)." Global Anabaptist Mennonite Encyclopedia Online. 1955. Global Anabaptist Mennonite Encyclopedia Online. Retrieved 4 November 2008 
Association des Églises Évangéliques Mennonites de France
Mennonite Churches in France

Mennonitism in France
Mennonite denominations
Mennonite World Conference
Evangelicalism in France